Jan Gunnar Faye Mohr (10 January 1921 – 17 March 2009) was a Norwegian-Danish physician and geneticist, known for his discovery of the first cases of autosomal genetic linkage in man, between the Lutheran blood groups and the ABH-secretor system, and between these and the hereditary disease myotonic dystrophy. Besides being first steps in mapping the human genome, the findings illustrated the medical potential of linkage analysis in prenatal genetic diagnosis. 
Mohr is eponymously known by the syndrome Mohr-Tranebjærg, a progressive deafness with X-linked mode of inheritance, which was first described by Jan Mohr, and then more comprehensively by Tranebjærg et al. The 'Mohr syndrome', or oral-facial-digital syndrome type II, is named after Otto Lous Mohr, uncle of Jan Mohr.

Biography
Jan Mohr was born 1921 in Paris. His father was the Norwegian painter Hugo Lous Mohr. Jan Mohr graduated 1948 from medical school, Oslo University. Then, under the Rockefeller Foundation, studied genetics at Columbia University, University College London and the Institute of Medical Genetics, Copenhagen University. In 1954, Mohr was awarded a doctorate at Copenhagen University, and in 1968 became a member of the Royal Danish Academy of Sciences and Letters.

At the University of Oslo, he established and directed through the years 1954-1964 the Institute of Medical Genetics, along somewhat similar lines as the Copenhagen Institute. In 1964 he succeeded Tage Kemp in the Chair as Professor of Medical Genetics, Copenhagen University. Together with Hans Eiberg he established Copenhagen Family Bank in 1972, a store of DNA samples, comprising about 1000 large Danish families as a basis for a Resource Center for Linkage analysis, RC-LINK, to study also familial diseases such as cystic fibrosis and Batten disease, both of which are among diseases mapped at the center.

In 1968 Mohr introduced the concept of antenatal genetic diagnosis using sampled chorionic villi, and then together with N.Hahnemann developed the approach (for diagnosis early in pregnancy) towards clinical application.

Mohr founded and edited until his retirement the journal Clinical Genetics: An International Journal of Genetics in Medicine, as a sequel to the Opera series of the Copenhagen Institute, which had been discontinued. This was in cooperation with his two Nordic colleagues Kåre Berg in Oslo and Jan Arvid Bøøk in Uppsala.

In 1966 Mohr was elected founding chairman of European Society of Human Genetics, and managed the Society through following years. As Professor emeritus he pursued his genetic interests under the European Commission as a concerted action project leader within cancer genetics, with participation of research groups from most European countries.

References
Mohr, Jan (1951). Search for linkage between the Lurtheran blood groups and other hereditary characters. Acta Path. Microbiol. Scand. 28:207-210
Mohr, Jan (1954). A Study of linkage in man. Opera ex Domo Biol Hered.Humanae Universitatis Hafniensis.Vol 33, Munksgaards Forlag. Copenhagen.
Renwick, J.H. and Bolling, D.R. (1971). Mohr's Hat Trick Confirmed. Fourth International Congress of Human Genetics, Paris, 1971 &
Renwick, J.H. and Bolling, D.R. (1971). An analysis procedure illustrated on a triple linkage of use for prenatal diagnosis of myotonic dystrophy. J. Medical Genet. 8: 399-406, 1971
Mohr, J. and Magerøy, K. (1960). Sex linked deafness of a possibly new type. Acta Genet. Statist. Med. 10: 54-62
Tranebjærg, L; Schwartz, C., Higgins, K., Barker, D.; Stevenson, R.; Arena, J.F.; Gedde-Dahl, T.; Mikkelsen, M.; Mellgren, S., Andersen, K., Hansen, E.; Dahl, A.; Eriksen, H.; Lubs, H. X-linked recessive mental retardation with progressive sensorineural deafness, blindness, spastic paraplegia and dystonia. Am. J. Hum. Genet. 51(suppl.); A47 only (1992).
Eiberg, H., Mohr, J., Schmiegelow, K., Nielsen, L.S., Williamson, R.: Linkage relationships of paraoxonase (PON) with other markers: Indication of PON-cystic fibrosis synteny. Clin Genet 28: 265-271 (1985)
Eiberg, H., Gardiner R.M., Mohr, J. Batten disease (Spielmeyer-Sjøgren disease)  and haptoglobin: Indication of linkage and assignment to chr.16 Clin Genet 36: 217-218
Mohr, O.L. (1941). A hereditary lethal syndrome in man. Avh. Norske Vidensk. Akad. Oslo 14: 1-18
Dunn, L.C. and Mohr, J. (1952). An association of hereditary eye defects with white spotting. Proc. Natl. Acad. Sci. USA, 38: 872-875
Mohr, J. (1968). Foetal genetic diagnosis. Development of techniques for early sampling of foetal cells. Acta Pathologica Microbiologic. Scandinavia 73: 7377
Hahnemann, N. and Mohr, J. (1969). Antenatal diagnosis in genetic disease. Bulletin of the European Society of Human Genetics, Vol 3, p 47-54
Hahnemann, N. (1974). Early prenatal diagnosis: A study of biopsy techniques and cell culturing techniques from extraembryonic membrane. Clin.Genet., 6, 294-306
Meena Upadhyaya, Alan Fryer, Graham Foat, Denise Robinson, Oliver Quarrell, Adrian Roberts, P.S. Harper (1989). Chorionic villus sampling for prenatal diagnosis in   Wales using DNA probes - 5 years experience. Prenatal diagnosis. Vol 10, Issue 9, Pages 593-603
Woo, J. (1990+). A short history of Amniocentesis, Fetoscopy, and Chorionic Villus Sampling (Net).

Bibliography
Mohr, J. (1954) A Study of Linkage in Man. Munksgaards Forlag, Copenhagen.
Mohr, J. (1982). Arvelighedslære 4 udg.  Nyt Nordisk Forlag Arnold Busck, Copenhagen.

Danish scientists
1921 births
2009 deaths
Norwegian geneticists
Danish geneticists
Norwegian expatriates in France
Norwegian expatriates in the United States
Norwegian expatriates in the United Kingdom
Norwegian emigrants to Denmark